Campo Santo Stefano is a city square near the Ponte dell'Accademia, in the sestiere of San Marco, Venice, Italy.

Buildings around the square
Santo Stefano, Venice
San Vidal, Venice
Palazzo Morosini Gatterburg
Palazzo Loredan
Palazzo Pisani a Santo Stefano

Piazzas and campos in Venice